Sam Adams (born May 9, 1946) is an American professional golfer who played on the PGA Tour. He is one of few left-handers to win a PGA Tour event.

Adams was born in Boone, North Carolina. He played golf collegiately at Appalachian State University. He turned professional in 1969.

On September 30, 1973, Adams recorded the only victory of his PGA Tour career, posting a 16-under-par 268 at the Quad Cities Open to win by three strokes over Dwight Nevil and Kermit Zarley. He was the first American lefty to win on the PGA Tour. He also had several other top-10 finishes including a T-2 finish at the 1972 Canadian Open. His best finish in a major championship was a T-23 at the 1977 U.S. Open.

Adams played on the Sunbelt Senior Tour after reaching age 50.

Professional wins (3)

PGA Tour wins (1)

Other wins (2)
this list may be incomplete
1975 North Carolina Open
2000 Tennessee PGA Championship

See also 

 1971 PGA Tour Qualifying School graduates

External links

American male golfers
PGA Tour golfers
Golfers from North Carolina
Left-handed golfers
Appalachian State University alumni
People from Boone, North Carolina
1946 births
Living people